Amanita ravenelii, commonly known as the pinecone lepidella, is a species of fungus in the family Amanitaceae. The stem has a large bulb at its base, covered with whitish to brownish scales, that may root several centimeters into the soil. The ring on the stem is thick and cotton- or felt-like. It is widely distributed in mixed and deciduous forests of the southeastern United States, where it grows solitarily or in groups on the ground in late summer and autumn. The mushrooms have a unique odor resembling bleaching powder.

Taxonomy
The species was first described scientifically by Miles Joseph Berkeley and Moses Ashley Curtis in 1859 as Agaricus ravenelii. Pier Andrea Saccardo transferred it to the genus Amanita in 1887. It is in the subsection Solitariae, section Lepidella in the genus Amanita. Other North American species in the section Lepidella include A. abrupta, A. atkinsoniana, A. chlorinosma, A. cokeri, A. daucipes, A. mutabilis, A. onusta, A. pelioma, A. polypyramis, and A. rhopalopus.

The specific epithet ravenelli honors the American mycologist Henry William Ravenel. The fungus is commonly known as the "pinecone Lepidella".

Description

It is fleshy, white to yellowish-white, usually dry, but occasionally slightly sticky with age. The universal veil remains as a pale yellow to brownish-orange layer that breaks up into crowded, rather coarse, conical to truncate-conical warts. The margin is non-striate (without any grooves), and appendiculate (with partial veil remnants hanging along the cap margin). The gills are free from attachment to the stem, crowded together, moderately broad, and yellowish-white to pale yellow. Interspersed among the gills are short gills (lamellulae) that do not extend completely to the stem; they are somewhat truncated (abruptly terminated) to attenuated (tapering gradually). It is solid (i.e., not hollow), white to pale yellow, and covered with tufts of soft woolly hairs or fibrils. The partial veil is yellowish-white to pale yellow, forming a ring which is thick, woolly, delicate, and soon falls away. The universal veil remains at the stem base as thick scales, curved downward, often forming irregular rings. The flesh is firm, and white to pale yellow. The mushroom tissue has an odor of chlorinated lime (bleaching powder), or "old tennis shoes". The edibility of species in Amanita subgenus Lepidella have been described variously as unknown, "not recommended", or poisonous.

Microscopic characteristics
The spores are ellipsoid, occasionally ovoid or obovoid, thin-walled, hyaline, amyloid, and measure 8–11 by 5.5–7.5 μm. The spore deposit is white. The basidia (spore-bearing cells) are 40–65 by 7–11.5 μm, four-spored, with clamps at their bases. Cheilocystidia (cystidia on the gill edge) are occasionally seen as small, club-shaped cells measuring 15–35 by 10–15 μm, on thin-walled hyphae that are 3–7 μm in diameter. The cap cuticle, which is not clearly differentiated from the cap tissue, consists of thin-walled, interwoven hyphae 2.5–9 μm in diameter. The tissue of the universal veil on the cap consists of more or less parallel and erect rows of roughly spherical, and ellipsoid to broadly ellipsoid cells, up to 78 by 65 μm and spindle- to club-shaped cells up to 125 by 30 μm. These latter cells are terminal or in short, terminal chains, and are borne on moderately abundant, thin-walled, branched, interwoven, sometimes nearly coralloid hyphae, 3–9.5 μm diameter with a few scattered oleiferous (oil-containing) hyphae, 5–12.5 μm diameter. The distribution of hyphae at the stem base is similar to that on the cap, but with more filamentous hyphae. Clamp connections are present.

Similar species

The fruit bodies of A. ravenelii are distinguished from A. chlorinosma by the presence of pale yellow to brownish orange, large, conical to truncate-conical warts on the cap surface and a large basal bulb. The mushroom A. polypyramis is pure white, and lacks the pale yellow to brownish-orange large conical warts typical of A. ravenelii. The North American species A. armillariiformis has a similar areolate cap surface, but unlike A. ravenelii, does not have a distinct basal bulb, and it is found in semi-arid areas associated with aspen and old growth Douglas fir. Also from North America, A. mutabilis has pink tones on the cap and stem, and will turn pink when its flesh is cut; it smells of anise.

Habitat and distribution
Amanita ravenelii is a mycorrhizal fungus, meaning it forms mutualistic associations with shrubs and trees. Mushrooms grow on the ground solitarily, scattered, or in groups in mixed coniferous and deciduous forests. Although the specific tree associations preferred by A. ravenelii are unknown, in general, Amanita from section Lepidella tend to associate with diploxylon pine (that is, pines in subgenus Pinus), oak, and hickory.

Amanita ravenelii is widely distributed in the southeastern United States, where their occurrence is "occasional to frequent" in the late summer and autumn months of August to November; mushrooms been collected from the US states of Maryland, North Carolina, South Carolina, Indiana, Tennessee, and Virginia. It has also been reported growing in northern Baja California, Mexico.

See also

 List of Amanita species

References

Cited books

ravenelii
Fungi described in 1859
Fungi of North America
Inedible fungi
Taxa named by Miles Joseph Berkeley
Taxa named by Moses Ashley Curtis